The 1971 Wellington City mayoral election was part of the New Zealand local elections held that same year. In 1971, elections were held for the Mayor of Wellington plus other local government positions including fifteen city councillors. The polling was conducted using the standard first-past-the-post electoral method.

Background
The election saw incumbent Mayor Sir Frank Kitts re-elected for a record equaling sixth term as Wellington's Mayor, defeating his main opponent, former New Zealand Farmers' Union chairman Alex O'Shea. The Citizens' Association has difficulty in selecting its mayoral candidate with many speculating that it would not opt to contest the position, leading commentators to label them as "defeatist". Deputy mayor George Porter was approached to stand, but declined the nomination for "personal reasons", offering himself only for a council seat. Eventually O'Shea was chosen by the Citizens' Association executive over two other undisclosed aspirants.

The election also saw a third electoral ticket emerge "Civic Reform", who would unsuccessfully challenge the two-ticket system that had dominated Wellington's local body politics since the 1930s. Civic Reform also contested the 1974 and 1977 local elections with even less success.

The main talking point following the election was that the initial results showed that the Labour Party had won a majority on the council, the first time they had done so. However, following the counting of special votes the fifteenth highest (last successful) polling candidate, Labour's Joe Aspell, lost his seat to Citizens' candidate Ian Lawrence (a future Mayor) after a 23-vote lead became a 17-vote defeat thus leaving the state of parties at 8–7 in favour of the Citizens' Association.

Mayoralty results

Councillor results

References

Mayoral elections in Wellington
1971 elections in New Zealand
Politics of the Wellington Region
October 1971 events in New Zealand
1970s in Wellington